70th parallel may refer to:

70th parallel north, a circle of latitude in the Northern Hemisphere
70th parallel south, a circle of latitude in the Southern Hemisphere